Non-operating income, in accounting and finance, is gains or losses from sources not related to the typical activities of the business or organization.  Non-operating income can include gains or losses from investments, property or asset sales, currency exchange, and other atypical gains or losses.  Non-operating income is generally not recurring and is therefore usually excluded or considered separately when evaluating performance over a period of time (e.g. a quarter or year).

See also
 Revenue
 Gross profit
 Earnings before interest, taxes, depreciation and amortization (EBITDA)
 Earnings Before Interest, Taxes, Depreciation, Amortization, and Restructuring or Rent Costs(EBITDAR)
 Operating profit
 Net income per employee
 Earnings before tax (EBT)
 Net profit or Net income
Financial Result
 Profit Before Interest, Depreciation & Taxes - PBDIT
 Earnings Before Depreciation, Interest and Taxes - EBDIT

References

External links 
 Non-Operating Income at investopedia.com
 BusinessDictionary.com

Fundamental analysis
Income statement
Profit